"I Just Shot John Lennon" is a song from  The Cranberries' album To the Faithful Departed. It is a narrative of the events of the night of December 8, 1980, the night that musician John Lennon was murdered by Mark David Chapman in front of The Dakota in New York City. It is one of many tributes to Lennon, and also one of many other songs to recall the events of the night. After the narrative, there is commentary: "What a sad, and sorry and sickening sight".

The title of the song comes from the words said by Chapman that evening. After being asked, "Do you know what you've done?" Chapman calmly replied, "Yes, I just shot John Lennon".

Live performances 
The Cranberries performed the song live on The Late Show with David Letterman in 1995.  Another live-session of the song is available on their single "Salvation".

References

The Cranberries songs
1996 songs
Songs about criminals
Songs written by Dolores O'Riordan
Songs written by Noel Hogan
Song recordings produced by Bruce Fairbairn
Songs about John Lennon
Songs based on American history